Adolf Meier (12 February 1902 – 10 January 1949) was a Swiss athlete. He competed at the 1924 Summer Olympics and the 1928 Summer Olympics.

References

External links
 

1902 births
1949 deaths
Athletes (track and field) at the 1924 Summer Olympics
Athletes (track and field) at the 1928 Summer Olympics
Swiss male long jumpers
Swiss decathletes
Olympic athletes of Switzerland
Place of birth missing
Olympic decathletes